Segarra is a comarca (county) in Catalonia, Spain, situated on a high plain. Historically, the name referred to a larger area than the current comarca. It has a continental climate, with cold winters and hot summers, and between 350 and 450 mm (15-18 inches) of rainfall per year. It is a grain-growing region, with some pine woods and a few evergreen oaks.

Municipalities

References

External links
Official comarcal web site (in Catalan)

 
Comarques of the Province of Lleida